The Ukrainian identity card or Passport of the Citizen of Ukraine (also known as the Internal Passport or Passport Card) is an identity document issued to citizens of Ukraine. Every Ukrainian citizen aged 14  or above and permanently residing in Ukraine must possess an identity card issued by local authorities of the State Migration Service of Ukraine. Ukrainian identity cards can be used as a travel document to enter Ukraine, Georgia (only if arriving from Ukraine), Moldova (only for purposes of local border traffic), and Turkey.

Identity cards are valid for 10 years (or 4 years, if issued for citizens aged between 14 and 18) and afterwards must be exchanged for a new document.

Current identity card
The current Ukrainian identity card takes the form of a credit card sized plastic card with an integrated contactless microchip on which personal data is held. The top of the card bears the coat of arms of Ukraine, the name of the country - Ukraine, and the words 'Passport of the Citizen of Ukraine' in both Ukrainian and English. The flag of Ukraine appears in the top right corner of the card, whilst the international symbol for biometric documents can be found in the top left corner.

The front of the card bears a black and white laser embossed image of the holder, their signature and the following key personal details in both Ukrainian and English (Latin script):

The reverse of the card bears the following pieces of information:
Date of issue
Authority
Place of birth

Security features
Other than the integrated contactless microchip which holds a wider range of personal data than the information visible on the front or reverse of the card, the Ukrainian identity card makes use of a range of modern security techniques, including micro-printing, holographic elements, colour-changing ink, raised printing, laser embossing, and UV elements, visible only under ultraviolet light.

A number of personalised security elements are also used, such as a hologram on the card's reverse which alternately displays an image of the holder and their date of birth. Other personalised security elements include a metallic tape running along the reverse of the card into which the holder's name is laser engraved, and a machine readable zone.

History of identity cards in Ukraine
Ukraine first planned to introduce ID cards in 2004 during the presidency of Leonid Kuchma, with the start of production planned to coincide with the launch of a new Unified State Demographic Register. These cards were designed to contain a contactless chip - a design element which led to unease in certain sections of society. The planned introduction of both elements of this plan was cancelled by the newly elected President Viktor Yuschenko on 10 March 2005.

Later in 2005 the Ministry of Internal Affairs of Ukraine initiated a programme to introduce plastic ID cards which would have held tax and pensions data on an integrated electronic chip. This plan was later dropped after being criticised for having a lax approach to the security of personal data by ordinary citizens and the Ukrainian Helsinki Group. Similar plans were resurrected again in 2008, but were postponed to the future.

On 23 September 2011, The Ukrainian Parliament voted to replace domestic passports with ID cards (Ukrainian: Паспортна картка). The law provided for the new form of ID to be issued from 1 January 2012. However, the bill was vetoed by Ukrainian president Viktor Yanukovych on grounds of supposed failings in providing adequate personal data safeguards.

After numerous delays, the bill for the creation of the Unified State Demographic Register was passed and signed into law on 29 November 2012. This paved the way for the introduction of biometric passports for foreign travel and the replacement of internal passports with ID cards.

On 10 July 2015, the Ukrainian government announced that internal passports would be abolished and replaced with ID cards, starting from 1 January 2016. The first ID cards were issued to first-time applicants on 11 January 2016.

Previous internal passport (1992-2016)

From 1992 until 2016 Ukrainian internal passports were only produced and issued in the form of a traditional passport booklet. Regardless of the move to the new ID card format from 2016, all 1992 series passports currently remain valid.

1992 series passports had a dark blue cover and contained 16 pages. All information in the passport is recorded in the Ukrainian language, except for the holder's name, date and place of birth, and issuing authority, which are given both in Ukrainian and Russian, or stamps about person's residence in the Autonomous Republic of Crimea or Sevastopol, which could be written only in Russian.

The information contained within the passport included the holder's:

1992 series passports do not have an expiration date; they remain valid throughout the holder's life. Despite this, additional photographs need to be affixed on reaching the age of 25 and 45. It is also expected that any changes in marital status, eligibility for military service, and registered place of residence are subsequently recorded in the passport. Since 2016, the change in marital status is no longer recorded in a passport or on a biometric chip of an ID card

A new passport can be obtained if there is a change in holder's name, most commonly due to marriage. New passports are also issued in cases when the original passport has been subject to significant wear or tear, or has been lost or stolen.

International travel
In 2017, Turkey granted Ukrainian citizens the right to enter visa-free (up to 90 days) with an ID card. Furthermore, since March 2019, Georgia accepts the Ukrainian ID card if the passenger arrives directly from Ukraine.

References

Identity documents
National identity cards by country
Society of Ukraine